Insúa may refer to:

Argentinian footballers:
Emanuel Insúa (born 1991), Argentine footballer, currently playing for Vélez Sarsfield
Emiliano Insúa (born 1989), Argentine footballer, currently playing for Racing Club  
Federico Insúa (born 1980), retired Argentine footballer
Rubén Insúa (born 1961), retired Argentine footballer and manager

Spanish footballers:
Pablo Insúa (born 1993), Spanish footballer, currently playing for SD Huesca